Krithia is a village and a community of the Lagkadas municipality. Before the 2011 local government reform it was part of the municipality of Assiros, of which it was a municipal district. The 2011 census recorded 1,422 inhabitants in the village. The community of Krithia covers an area of 21.288 km2.

See also
 List of settlements in the Thessaloniki regional unit

References

Populated places in Thessaloniki (regional unit)